Nelson River is large river in Manitoba, Canada, flowing into the Hudson Bay.

Nelson River may also refer to:
 Nelson River (Saint-Charles River), a tributary of the Saint-Charles River in Quebec, Canada

 Fort Nelson River, in British Columbia, Canada

See also
 Nelson (disambiguation)
 River Nelson, American hip-hop artist